The Red Scare in Japan refers to the promotion of fear of the rise of communism or radical leftism in Japan.

Throughout the history of Imperial Japan, the government suppressed socialist and communist movements. In order to combat the Communist International, Japan signed the Anti-Comintern Pact with Germany and Italy in Nov. 6, 1937.

Near the end of World War II, Prince Konoe Fumimaro promoted the fear of a communist revolution as a result of Japan's defeat.

In response to Cold War tensions in Asia, the CIA funded the Japanese Liberal Democratic Party in an effort to turn Japan into a bulwark against communism during the 1950s and 1960s.

See also

 Japanese dissidence during the Shōwa period
 Political repression in Imperial Japan
 Japanese Red Army
 Red Purge

Further reading

External links

References

Political movements in Japan
Anti-communism in Japan
Japan–Soviet Union relations
Red Scare